Ryan Fitzgerald Murphy OLY (born July 2, 1995) is an American competitive swimmer specializing in backstroke. He is a four-time Olympic gold medalist and the former world-record holder in the men's 100-meter backstroke.

At the 2016 Summer Olympics, Murphy swept the backstroke events, winning gold medals in both the 100- and 200-meter backstroke races. He also won a gold medal in the 4×100-meter medley relay with Michael Phelps, Nathan Adrian, and Cody Miller, and Murphy's backstroke relay leg broke the world record previously set by Aaron Peirsol in 2009.

At the 2020 Summer Olympics, Murphy won a gold medal and set the world record in the 4x100-meter medley relay with Michael Andrew, Caeleb Dressel, and Zach Apple, in addition to a silver medal in the 200-meter backstroke and bronze medal in the 100-meter backstroke.

Early life and education
Murphy began dreaming of competing at the Olympic Games when he was seven years old.

Murphy graduated from Bolles School in Jacksonville, Florida in 2013 and attended the University of California, Berkeley. Swimming for the California Golden Bears (Cal), he was an eight-time NCAA individual national champion, winning the 100-yard and 200-yard backstrokes in 2014, 2015, 2016, and 2017.

Swimming career

2011
At the age of 16, Murphy earned his first career international medals, both in the 200-meter backstroke.  At the 2011 World Junior Swimming Championships in Lima, Murphy won a bronze medal in the 200-meter backstroke with a time of 1:59.63. Later in 2011, at the 2011 Pan American Games, Murphy won another bronze also in the 200-meter backstroke. In the final, he recorded a time of 1:58.50.

2012

At the 2012 United States Olympic Trials, Murphy missed the Olympic team, finishing sixth in the 100-meter backstroke (53.92) and fourth in the 200-meter backstroke (1:57.39).

Following the Olympics, Murphy competed at the 2012 World Short Course Championships in Istanbul. He won a bronze medal in the 200-meter backstroke with a time of 1:48.86, finishing behind Radosław Kawęcki and Ryan Lochte. Murphy earned a gold medal in the 4×100-meter medley relay for his participation in the heats, swimming the backstroke leg with a time of 50.91.

2013
At the 2013 US National Championships, Murphy just missed qualifying for the 2013 World Aquatics Championships, finishing third in the 100- and 200-meter backstroke with times of 53.38 and 1:56.37, respectively.

2014
Murphy won the 100- and 200-yard backstrokes at his first NCAA D1 Swimming Championships. His 100-yard backstroke time of 44.78 was a US 17–18 National Age Group (NAG) record, and his 200-yard backstroke time of 1:37.23 broke both Tyler Clary's NCAA record and the 17–18 NAG record. He also placed eighth in the 200-yard IM and swam on Cal's 200 and 400 medley and freestyle relays en route to Cal winning the team championship.

2015
At the 2015 NCAA Championships, Murphy swept the backstroke events. He broke the American record previously held by Ryan Lochte in the 200-yard backstroke. He also won the 100-yard backstroke, breaking Lochte's NCAA record. Murphy also placed fifth in the 200 individual medley (IM) and was named CSCAA Swimmer of the Meet.

2016

NCAA Championships
At the 2016 NCAA D1 Swimming Championships, Murphy continued his backstroke winning streak with first-place finishes the 100- and 200-yard backstrokes in record times. His times of 43.49 and 1:35.73, respectively broke his own NCAA, American, and US Open records. He also placed third in the 200-yard IM in 1:40.27 and was once again was named CSCAA Swimmer of the Meet, this time sharing the title with former Bolles teammates Joseph Schooling and Caeleb Dressel.

US Summer Olympic Trials
At the 2016 United States Olympic Trials in Omaha, Nebraska, Murphy made his first Olympic team by placing first in the 100- and 200-meter backstroke events. He also made the 4×100 medley relay by virtue of his win in the 100-meter backstroke.

2016 Rio Summer Olympics

At the 2016 Summer Olympics in Rio de Janeiro, Murphy won gold medals in the 100- and 200-meter backstroke, as well as in the 4×100-meter medley relay together with Cody Miller, Michael Phelps, and Nathan Adrian. Murphy broke Aaron Peirsol's world record for the 100-meter backstroke with his relay split time of 51.85, and the relay team as a whole set a new Olympic record with a time of 3:27.95. Murphy's win in the 100-meter backstroke, with a time of 51.97 seconds, set a new Olympic record for the event. It also marked the sixth consecutive time a swimmer representing the United States had won the gold medal in the 100-meter backstroke at the Olympic Games. His gold medal was also the first won by a male alumnus of a high school in Jacksonville, Florida for the United States in an individual swimming event. In total, at his first Olympic Games, Murphy raced and won gold medals in all three of his events, set three Olympic records and one world record, and was named as one of the stars of the 2016 Summer Olympics by the International Olympic Committee.

2017

NCAA Championships
At the 2017 NCAA championships, Murphy completed his four-for-four sweep of the 100- and 200-yard backstroke events, becoming only the fourth man in NCAA history to sweep 100- and 200-yard events of a single stroke four years in a row after John Nabor (backstroke), Pablo Morales (butterfly), and Brendan Hansen (breaststroke). Murphy also placed third in the 200-yard IM, leading after the breastroke leg but overtaken in freestyle.

World Championships

At the 2017 US National Championships, the qualifying meet for the 2017 World Aquatics Championships, Murphy won the 200-meter backstroke and placed second to Matt Grevers in the 100-meter backstroke to qualify for the World Championships later that year.

At the 2017 World Swimming Championships in Budapest, Murphy placed third in the 100-meter backstroke behind Xu Jiayu and Grevers and second in the 200-meter backstroke behind Evgeny Rylov and ahead of countryman and former college teammate Jacob Pebley. Murphy also earned gold medals by swimming in the prelims on the 4×100-meter medley and mixed medley relays. The mixed medley relay set a World and Championship record time of 3:40.28 in the prelims, a record later broken by in the US team in finals.

2018

2018 Pan Pacific Championships

During the 2018 Pan Pacific Swimming Championships in August 2018 in Tokyo, Japan, Murphy won three gold medals: one in the 100-meter backstroke, one in the 200-meter backstroke, and one in the 4x100-meter medley relay. Murphy's strong finish to the Championships, winning two gold medals on the final day of competition, was noted by Jacksonville newspaper The Florida Times-Union. His gold medal performance in the 200-meter backstroke with a time of 1:53.57 established a new Championships record that was over 1.5 seconds faster than the silver medalist in the event, Ryosuke Irie. Murphy opened up to Reuters after his success at the Championships, expressing he hoped that swimming in a pool close to where swimming competitions for the 2020 Summer Olympics would be held would help quell his superstitions concerning his performance at the upcoming Olympic Games.

USA Swimming took notice of Murphy's swims at the 2018 Pan Pacific Championships and nominated him for the "Relay Performance of the Year", "Male Race of the Year", and  "Male Athlete of the Year" Golden Goggle Awards. In total, he won all three awards for which he received nominations.

2018 World Short Course Championships
Murphy competed at the 2018 FINA World Swimming Championships in Hangzhou, China in December 2018. He won medals in three individual events: gold in the 100-meter backstroke, silver in the 50-meter backstroke, and silver in the 200-meter backstroke. He also medaled in three relay events: gold in the men's 4×100-meter medley relay, gold in the mixed 4×50-meter medley relay, and silver in the men's 4×50-meter medley relay.

2019

2019 World Aquatics Championships

In July 2019 at the 2019 World Aquatics Championships in Gwangju, South Korea, Murphy won three medals. Swimming with Lilly King, Caeleb Dressel, and Simone Manuel in the final of the mixed 4×100-meter medley relay, he won a silver medal. The relay finished two hundredths of a second behind Australia. Murphy also won the silver medal in the 200-meter backstroke and the men's 4×100-meter medley relay.

2021

2020 US Olympic Trials
In June 2021, Murphy qualified for the 2020 Olympic Games in Tokyo in the 100-meter backstroke at the 2020 USA Swimming Olympic Trials. He won the event at the US Olympic Trials, swimming a time of 52.33 at the final on June 15. He was the only veteran to qualify in the event for the 2020 Olympics; the other qualifier in the event, Hunter Armstrong, was a first-time member of the US Olympic Team. In the morning prelims of the 200-meter backstroke, Murphy placed fifth with a time of 1:57.95 and advanced to the semifinals. In the evening, Murphy swam a time of 1:55.60 and advanced to the finals in first-place overall. He swam a time of 1:54.20 in the final, winning the event and securing a spot at the 2020 Summer Olympics in the 200-meter backstroke.

2020 Summer Olympics

Murphy was selected as one of four captains for the US Olympic swim team at the 2020 Summer Olympics along with Caeleb Dressel, Simone Manuel, and Allison Schmitt. All four swimmers were veteran Olympians chosen to provide guidance for their fellow members of the US Olympic Swim Team, with Murphy highlighted for his calm demeanor and the stability he provided the team in a competitive context.

On day two of Olympic competition, in the prelims of the 100-meter backstroke, Murphy swam a 53.22 and tied in overall ranking for seventh with Russian Evgeny Rylov. In the semifinals the following day, Murphy swam the fastest in both semifinals heats with a time of 52.24 and advanced to the final. In the final, Murphy raced against a field of majority veteran Olympians, with five of the eight competitors, including himself, having competed in the final of the 100-meter backstroke at the 2016 Olympic Games. His time of 52.19 seconds won him the bronze medal. Speaking to national newspaper USA Today about winning the bronze medal after winning the gold medal in 2016, Murphy said, "Winning an Olympic gold means you're the best in the world. Being third in the world is no slouch."

On the fifth day of competition, Murphy advanced to the semifinals in the 200-meter backstroke with a time of 1:56.92, seventh overall in the prelims. In the semifinals, Murphy swam over one second faster than in the prelims with a time of 1:55.38 and qualified for the final in third place. Murphy won his second medal of the 2020 Olympics, a silver medal, in the final of the 200-meter backstroke with a time of 1:54.15 on day seven of competition.

In the final of the 4×100-meter mixed medley relay, Murphy swam the backstroke leg of the relay, Lydia Jacoby the breaststroke, Torri Huske the butterfly, and Caeleb Dressel the freestyle leg of the relay; they placed fifth. It was the first time the event was included in the Olympic program for swimming. Murphy held off the field in his leg of the relay, tying Thomas Ceccon of Italy for first at the wall. The American team fell to eighth place by the end of the butterfly leg of the relay but made up some time on the freestyle leg to place fifth overall. Jacoby's goggles had fallen off during her leg of the relay, to which Murphy responded, "Anyone that's swam with their goggles in their mouth like she did, she did fantastic."

On the final day, Murphy swam backstroke in the final of the 4×100-meter medley relay with teammates Michael Andrew (breaststroke), Caeleb Dressel (butterfly), and Zach Apple (freestyle). The relay won the gold medal in a world record time of 3:26.78, setting a new Olympic record in the process. By the end of the 2020 Olympics, Murphy had won a total of six Olympic medals, four in individual events and two in relay events, between his first (2016) and second (2020) Olympic Games. His contribution to the world record and gold medal in the final of the 4×100-meter medley relay earned him a nomination from the USA Swimming Foundation for the Golden Goggle Award for Relay Performance of the Year along with his finals relay teammates. Additionally, Murphy's support of his teammates and the integrity of swimming as a sport, as well as his consistent performances since the 2016 Summer Olympics, earned him a nomination for the Male Athlete of the Year Golden Goggle Award.

His swims in 2021 through the end of August secured his place on the 2021–2022 US National Team in the 100-meter backstroke and 200-meter backstroke events.

International Swimming League
For the 2021 season of the International Swimming League (ISL), Murphy was retained by the LA Current. He took a break from competition during the regular season of competition and remained on the roster heading into playoffs season. For his first race after the 2020 Olympic Games, Murphy swam a 1:48.43 in the 200-meter backstroke in the playoffs match number two, which was the fastest time in the 2021 year up to that point in time. For the second match of the playoffs, match thirteen overall, Murphy won enough points from his races to earn the most valuable player (MVP) of the match honor. In his second match of the playoffs season, match fifteen overall, Murphy ranked second overall in terms of MVP points, just 4.0 points behind Duncan Scott of London Roar, who was named match MVP. Starting off his third and final playoffs match of the season, Murphy won 19.0 points for his team in one race, winning the 200-meter backstroke in a personal season-best time of 1:48.10. Later the same day, in the 50-meter backstroke, Murphy won the event and set new Americas, American, and ISL records with a time of 22.53 seconds, surpassing the previous records in the event that he himself had set in the 2020 ISL season at 22.54 seconds. The second and final day of the match, Murphy won the 50-meter backstroke skins event, outscoring his competitors and winning in the final head-to-head race against Evgeny Rylov of Energy Standard with a time of 24.22 seconds. Murphy's performances earned him the number two spot for "The Week That Was" from Swimming World for the week of November 29. For the MVP points he had earned since the beginning of the ISL to the end of the 2021 season, Murphy ranked eighth overall with 610 points across thirteen matches.

2022
On day two of the 2022 US International Team Trials in Greensboro, North Carolina, Murphy qualified for the final of the 200-meter backstroke, ranking third in the prelim heats with a time of 1:57.46 and winning the final, qualifying for the 2022 World Aquatics Championships team with a time of 1:55.01. He swam a time of 24.57 in the final of the 50-meter backstroke and placed fourth. In the final of the 100-meter backstroke, Murphy placed second behind Hunter Armstrong with a time of 52.46 seconds, also qualifying for the World Championships team in the event. In October, he was named to the roster for the 2022 World Short Course Championships in the 100-meter backstroke and the 200-meter backstroke.

International championships

 Murphy swam only in the prelims heats.

Personal best times

World records

Legend: r – relay lead-off leg

 with Michael Andrew (breaststroke), Caeleb Dressel (butterfly), Zach Apple (freestyle)

Olympic records

Legend: WR – World record; r – relay lead-off leg

 split 51.85 in backstroke; with Cody Miller (breaststroke), Michael Phelps (butterfly), Nathan Adrian (freestyle)
 split 52.31 in backstroke; with Michael Andrew (breaststroke), Caeleb Dressel (butterfly), Zach Apple (freestyle)

Awards and honors
 International Swimming League, Match Most Valuable Player: 2021 Match 13
 Swimming World, The Week That Was: November 29, 2021 (#2)
 Golden Goggle Award, Male Athlete of the Year: 2018
 Golden Goggle Award, Relay Performance of the Year: 2018 (4x100-meter medley relay), 2021 (4x100-meter medley relay)
 Golden Goggle Award, Male Race of the Year: 2018 (100-meter backstroke)
 SwimSwam Top 100 (Men's): 2021 (#7), 2022 (#9)
 SwimSwam Swammy Award, U.S. Swimmer of the Year (male): 2018
 SwimSwam Swammy Award, NCAA Swimmer of the Year (male): 2014, 2016
 Pac-12 Conference, Scholar-Athlete of the Year (Men's Swimming & Diving): 2016—2017
 Pac-12 Conference, Swimmer of the Year: 2015, 2016, 2017
 Pac-12 Conference, Freshman/Newcomer of the Year: 2014
 Golden Goggle Award nominee, Breakout Performer of the Year: 2014
 Golden Goggle Award nominee, Male Athlete of the Year: 2021

Personal life
Murphy began dating Bridget Konttinen, his University of California, Berkeley classmate in business, in 2016. The couple announced their engagement on May 15, 2022.

In an interview with Melvin Stewart of SwimSwam in 2021, Murphy shared that he is approximately 95% Irish by ancestry; his mother is of full Irish descent and his father is approximately 90% Irish by ancestry. Murphy was raised in a strong Roman Catholic family and remains committed to his faith, stating, "I’m a firm believer in God. My faith is important to me. There are, however, times when I rely on him more than others. Overall, I am private in my spirituality."

See also

 List of people from Florida
 List of people from Jacksonville, Florida
 World and Olympic records set at the 2016 Summer Olympics
 World and Olympic records set at the 2020 Summer Olympics
 World record progression 100 metres backstroke
 World record progression 4 × 100 metres medley relay
 List of multiple Olympic gold medalists at a single Games
 List of multiple Olympic gold medalists

References

External links

 
 
 
 
 
 
 Ryan Murphy – University of California athlete profile at CalBears.com

1995 births
Living people
American Roman Catholics
American male backstroke swimmers
California Golden Bears men's swimmers
Medalists at the FINA World Swimming Championships (25 m)
Swimmers at the 2011 Pan American Games
Swimmers at the 2016 Summer Olympics
World Aquatics Championships medalists in swimming
Pan American Games bronze medalists for the United States
Medalists at the 2016 Summer Olympics
Medalists at the 2020 Summer Olympics
Olympic gold medalists for the United States in swimming
Olympic bronze medalists for the United States in swimming
Bolles School alumni
Pan American Games medalists in swimming
Swimmers from Chicago
Medalists at the 2011 Pan American Games
Swimmers at the 2020 Summer Olympics
Olympic silver medalists for the United States in swimming
21st-century American people